Volcatius Sedigitus was the titulus of a Roman literary critic who flourished around 100 , noted for his ranking of those he considered the best Latin comics.

Nothing is known about Sedigitus  beyond that Pliny, who  calls him illustrem in poetica, states that he got his cognomen because he  was born with six fingers on each hand. This rare state, known as polydactyly, is caused by a dominant gene. 'Six digits (fingers or toes)' in Latin is sex digitī  (singular digitus.) The Romans did not avoid openly referencing blemishes and personal infirmities in the names they gave to public figures. (See Roman naming conventions.)  A literary critic, his origin may have been from outside the Roman Empire or his origins may have been lowly. Volcatius is an adjective referring to the Volcatia gens and to the Volcae, a Celtic people.

From his work Dē Poētīs Aulus Gellius' Noctēs Atticae preserves 13 iambic senarii in didascaly, in which "Canon", as it has been termed, the principal Latin comics are enumerated in order of merit, from greatest: Caecilius, Plautus, Naevius, Licinius, Atilius, Terence, Turpilius, Trabea, Luscius, Ennius.

Historian Suetonius' work Vita Terentii (Life of Terence) quotes "Vulcacius" as having given a few details about Terence's leaving Rome and consequent disappearing. Viz., Sedigitus said that the playwright was going to Asia, i.e., Pergamum, and was never seen again.

References

Bibliography

Year of birth missing
Year of death missing
Ancient Roman poets
2nd-century BC poets
2nd-century BC Romans
Literary critics
Volcatii